Khurram Shazad (born 21 October 1990) is a footballer who plays as a midfielder, winger, or attacker for Silsden. Born in England, he was a youth international for Pakistan. Besides England, he has played in the United States and Austria.

Career

Club career

In 2011, Shazad joined the Young Harris Mountain Lions in the United States. In 2013, he signed for American fourth division side Rocket City United. Before the second half of 2014–15, Shazad signed for WSG Tirol in the Austrian second division, where he made 48 appearances and scored 7 goals. On 21 March 2015, he debuted for WSG Tirol during a 1-0 win over FC Bizau. On 28 March 2015, Shazad scored his first goal for WSG Tirol during a 4-1 win over TSV St. Johann. In 2018, he signed for English ninth division club Eccleshill.

International career

Shazad is eligible to represent Pakistan internationally.

References

External links
 Khurram Shazad at playmakerstats.com

English people of Pakistani descent
English footballers
Pakistani expatriate sportspeople in the United States
Pakistani expatriates in Austria
English expatriate sportspeople in Austria
Eccleshill United F.C. players
Young Harris Mountain Lions men's soccer players
Living people
1990 births
Rocket City United players
National Premier Soccer League players
WSG Tirol players
2. Liga (Austria) players
Albion Sports A.F.C. players
Northern Counties East Football League players
English expatriate sportspeople in the United States
English expatriate footballers
Pakistani expatriate footballers
Association football wingers
Expatriate soccer players in the United States
Pakistani footballers
Association football forwards
Expatriate footballers in Austria
Association football midfielders